The 1973 Bassetlaw District Council election took place on 7 June 1973, to elect all 51 members of Bassetlaw District Council in England. This was on the same day as other local elections. The election resulted in the Labour Party winning a majority of seats on the council.

This was the first election to elect members of the new district council for Bassetlaw following its creation by the Local Government Act 1972. The council acted as a shadow authority until 1 April 1974, when it gained control over local government functions from its predecessor authorities; the East Retford Rural District, the Municipal Borough of East Retford, the Municipal Borough of Worksop and the Worksop Rural District councils.

Result

Ward results

Blyth (1)

Carlton

East Retford West

References

1973 English local elections
1973